Gertrude – The Cry is a play by British playwright Howard Barker. The play had its world premiere in 2002, directed by the author, in the great hall of Elsinore Castle, Denmark as part of the annual international Hamlet Festival. Its original production featured actors Tom Burke, Sean O'Callaghan, Jason Morell, Justin Avoth, Emma Gersch, Jane Bertish and Victoria Wicks.

Gertrude – The Cry is Howard Barker's reworking of Shakespeare's Hamlet, focusing on the character of Gertrude, the mother of the protagonist in Shakespeare's play. It is not the first time Barker took an existing play as the basis for a reworking. In 1991, he re-imagined Chekhov's Uncle Vanya in his play Vanya, and in 1986 he adapted Thomas Middleton's Women Beware Women.

Barker considers Gertrude to be one of his major works, remarking that "It's probably my best play... The one for which I feel the greatest satisfaction in".

Characters
Gertrude, a Queen
Claudius, a Prince
Cascan, Servant to Gertrude
Hamlet, an Heir
Isola, Mother of Claudius
Ragusa, a Young Woman
Albert, a Duke of Mecklenburg

References

Plays and musicals based on Hamlet
2002 plays
British plays